The 1961 Cleveland Indians season was a season in American baseball. The team finished fifth in the newly expanded 10-team American League with a record of 78–83, 30½ games behind the New York Yankees. Although the 1961 season ended up being a disappointment, the Indians had a brief flurry of pennant fever early in the 1961 season. After starting 12-13, the Indians started to streak, going 22-4 over their next 26 games to reach a record of 34-17 (were 38-20 after 58 games). However the Indians cooled off afterwards and were quickly knocked out of first place, as they went 44-66 the rest of the year. For the 2nd year in a row, the Indians had held first place in June, only to slump to a losing record. This would happen again in 1962 as well (47-34 start in early July).

Offseason 
 December 14, 1960: 1960 MLB expansion draft
Marty Keough was drafted from the Indians by the Washington Senators.
Jim King was drafted from the Indians by the Washington Senators.
 December 27, 1960: Paul Casanova was signed as a free agent by the Indians.

Regular season

Season standings

Record vs. opponents

Notable transactions 
 April 23, 1961: Paul Casanova was released by the Indians.
 May 10, 1961: Joe Morgan, a player to be named later and cash were traded by the Indians to the St. Louis Cardinals for Bob Nieman. The Indians completed the deal by sending Mike Lee to the Cardinals on June 1.
 June 12, 1961: Tommy John was signed as an amateur free agent by the Indians.
 October 5, 1961: Jimmy Piersall was traded by the Indians to the Washington Senators for Dick Donovan, Gene Green, and Jim Mahoney.

Opening Day Lineup

Roster

Player stats

Batting

Starters by position 
Note: Pos = Position; G = Games played; AB = At bats; H = Hits; Avg. = Batting average; HR = Home runs; RBI = Runs batted in

Other batters 
Note: G = Games played; AB = At bats; H = Hits; Avg. = Batting average; HR = Home runs; RBI = Runs batted in

Pitching

Starting pitchers 
Note: G = Games pitched; IP = Innings pitched; W = Wins; L = Losses; ERA = Earned run average; SO = Strikeouts

Other pitchers 
Note: G = Games pitched; IP = Innings pitched; W = Wins; L = Losses; ERA = Earned run average; SO = Strikeouts

Relief pitchers 
Note: G = Games pitched; W = Wins; L = Losses; SV = Saves; ERA = Earned run average; SO = Strikeouts

Farm system 

LEAGUE CHAMPIONS: Selma

References

External links 
1961 Cleveland Indians season at Baseball Reference

Cleveland Guardians seasons
Cleveland Indians season
Cleveland Indians